Imran Mohamed (born 18 December 1980) is a Maldivian footballer who played as a goalkeeper. He is currently retired. He retired from international football in 2016 after the Laos vs Maldives match at the age of 35.

International career
He was a member of the Maldives national football team. Imran retired from national team on 12 Oct 2016 after being the first choice national goalkeeper for almost 17 years.

2008 Saff Championship
In 2008, the Maldives national team won the SAFF Championship for the first time. Imran made some wonderful saves in the final and the semifinal. Many Sri Lankan coaches who previously coached in the Maldives consider his wonderful saves the reason why the whole Maldivian nation rejoiced when the team won the championship.

Goals
Imran has scored a goal whilst being in his own penalty area in the match against Victory Sports Club in President's Cup. He scored the goal from 115 yards. Victory SC's coach Ali Suzain said that the goal was due to Victory Sports Club keeper Faisal's mistake which has cost a goal.

See also
 List of men's footballers with 100 or more international caps

References

External links
 Imran (2002) at Aafathis

1980 births
Living people
Maldivian footballers
Maldives international footballers
Victory Sports Club players
Club Valencia players
New Radiant S.C. players
Maziya S&RC players
Association football goalkeepers
Footballers at the 2002 Asian Games
Footballers at the 2006 Asian Games
Footballers at the 2010 Asian Games
Asian Games competitors for the Maldives
FIFA Century Club
T.C. Sports Club players
Club Eagles players